In pre-modern medicine, the term catagmatic generally referred to any treatment purported to heal bone fractures, by promoting the formation of a callus.

The principal catagmatics were Armenian bole, tragacanth, osteocolla, Cyprus nuts, frankincense, aloes, and acacia.

The word comes from the Greek , "fracture".

References

Bone fractures
Traditional medicine